Frances Ellen Bedford (born 5 November 1953) is an Australian politician who represented the South Australian House of Assembly seat of Florey from 1997 state election until 2022, first for the Labor Party and from 2017 as an independent.

Early life
Bedford was born in Sydney and moved to Melbourne and then Adelaide after the death of her mother. She became involved in politics and became an electorate officer for former Labor MP Peter Duncan.

Parliament
Bedford was elected to the South Australian House of Assembly seat of Florey at the 1997 state election for the Labor Party.

Hailing from the Labor Left, Bedford has described herself as being South Australia's most left-wing MP. Her support for the Relationships Bill 2005, a bill which extends legal protections to same-sex couples, has made her a target of fundamentalist groups. Her opinions are considered by some as being incompatible with the opinions of her 'bible belt' electorate. Despite this, she was returned with a large majority at the landslide 2006 state election with a technically safe 62.1 percent two-party vote from an 8.5-point two-party swing, defeating Liberal candidate and Assemblies of God pastor Pat Trainor. She has otherwise won the seat marginally since 1997. At the 2014 state election, Bedford held Florey with a margin of 2.5 percent.

Bedford resigned from Labor and became an independent on 28 March 2017 after Labor's Jack Snelling won Florey pre-selection partly as a result of the major electoral redistribution which moved two-thirds of Playford voters in to Florey ahead of the 2018 state election. As with the rest of the crossbench, Bedford continued to provide confidence and supply support to the minority Labor government. A ReachTEL poll conducted on 2 March 2017 of 606 voters in post-redistribution Florey indicated a 33.4 percent primary vote for Bedford running as an independent which would likely see the endorsed Labor candidate defeated after preferences. In December 2017, Snelling decided not to nominate for Florey, and was replaced as Labor's endorsed candidate by Rik Morris. Bedford successfully re-contested Florey as an independent at the 2018 state election, gaining a 30.6 percent first preference vote and defeating Morris on preferences.

In October 2021, Bedford announced she would move to contest the seat of Newland at the 2022 state election. She justified the move citing electoral boundary changes pushing much of her constituents into the Newland electorate for the 2022 state election. She placed third, gaining 12% of the vote, and was defeated.

References

External links

Official website of Frances Bedford MP JP
 

1953 births
Living people
Australian Labor Party members of the Parliament of South Australia
Independent members of the Parliament of South Australia
Members of the South Australian House of Assembly
21st-century Australian politicians
21st-century Australian women politicians
Women members of the South Australian House of Assembly